The men's triple jump event at the 1968 European Indoor Games was held on 10 March in Madrid.

Results

References

Triple jump at the European Athletics Indoor Championships
Triple